Strumaria gemmata is a species of flowering plant in the family Amaryllidaceae, native to the Cape Provinces and the Free State of South Africa. It was first described by John Bellenden Ker Gawler in 1814.

Description
Members of the genus Strumaria have flowers in umbels, typically on long pedicels. Strumaria gemmata is the only species in the genus with yellowish flowers (the others have white or in a few cases pink flowers). The colour is mainly on the midrib of the tepals, which are channelled and have wavy (crisped) edges.

Distribution and habitat
Strumaria gemmata is native to semi-arid areas of the Cape Provinces and the Free State of South Africa.

References

gemmata
Flora of the Cape Provinces
Flora of the Free State
Plants described in 1814